The 1981 Dutch Open was a Grand Prix tennis tournament staged in Hilversum, Netherlands. The tournament was played on outdoor clay courts and was held from 20 July until 26 July 1981. It was the 25th edition of the tournament. Balázs Taróczy won his fourth consecutive title at the event and his fifth in total.

Finals

Singles

 Balázs Taróczy defeated  Heinz Günthardt 6–3, 6–7, 6–4

Doubles

 Heinz Günthardt /  Balázs Taróczy defeated  Raymond Moore /  Andrew Pattison 6–0, 6–2

References

External links
 ITF tournament edition details

Dutch Open (tennis)
Dutch Open (tennis)
Dutch Open
Dutch Open (tennis), 1981
July 1981 sports events in Europe